Matta may refer to:

Places
 Mata, Israel, a moshav in Israel, southwest of Jerusalem; also spelt Matta
 Matta, Punjab, a Union Council of Kasur District, Pakistan
 Matta, Russia, a village in Megyuryonsky Rural Okrug in the Megino-Kangalassky District in the Sakha Republic
 Matta, Suriname, an indigenous village in Suriname
 Matta (river), a river in the Sakha Republic, Russia
 Matta River (Virginia), United States
 Matta, Swat, a city in Swat, NWFP Pakistan, the main centre of TNSM

People

Sport
Svein Mathisen (1952–2011), Norwegian footballer with nickname Matta
Cristiano da Matta (born 1973), Brazilian auto racing driver
Thad Matta (born 1967), American college basketball coach

Other fields
Basheer Matta, Pakistani politician
Matta (chief), a chief of Siwistan in the 7th century A.D.
Abouna Matta El Meskeen (1919–2006), Coptic Orthodox monk
Gordon Matta-Clark (1943–1978), American artist
Liana Fiol Matta (born 1946), Puerto Rican jurist
Roberto Matta (1911–2002), one of Chile's best-known painters
Urano Teixeira da Matta Bacellar (1947–2006), Brazilian soldier

Other uses
Matta (restaurant), a Vietnamese restaurant in Portland, Oregon, U.S.
Matta (spider), a genus of spiders in the family Tetrablemmidae
Matta rice, a variety of rice grown in the Palakkad District of Kerala, India